Oene Sierksma  (born 1951? in Kampen, Overijssel) is a Dutch politician of the Reformatory Political Federation (RPF) and its successor the ChristianUnion (CU).

Sierksma was mayor of Nieuw-Lekkerland from 2002 to 2007.

References

1950s births
Living people
Christian Union (Netherlands) politicians
21st-century Dutch politicians
Mayors in South Holland
People from Nieuw-Lekkerland
Members of the Provincial Council of South Holland
Municipal councillors in South Holland
People from Kampen, Overijssel
Protestant Church Christians from the Netherlands
Reformatory Political Federation politicians